Earias vittella, an Asian "spotted bollworm", is a moth species in the family Nolidae. The species was first described by Johan Christian Fabricius in 1794. Most records are from Asia, Australia and certain Pacific islands.

References

External links

Moths of Asia
Nolidae
Moths described in 1794
Taxa named by Johan Christian Fabricius